Neurogomphus is a genus of dragonfly in the family Gomphidae. It contains the following species:
 Neurogomphus dissimilis
 Neurogomphus featheri
 Neurogomphus pinheyi
 Neurogomphus zambeziensis

References 

Gomphidae
Anisoptera genera
Taxonomy articles created by Polbot